Max Mitchinson (15 December 1927 – 15 May 2017) was an Australian rules footballer who played with St Kilda in the Victorian Football League (VFL).

Notes

External links 

1927 births
Australian rules footballers from Victoria (Australia)
St Kilda Football Club players
2017 deaths